Justicia is a genus of flowering plants in the family Acanthaceae. It is the largest genus within the family, encompassing around 700 species with hundreds more as yet unresolved. They are native to tropical to warm temperate regions of the Americas, India, and Africa. The genus serves as host to many butterfly species, such as Anartia fatima.  Common names include water-willow and shrimp plant, the latter from the inflorescences, which resemble a shrimp in some species. The generic name honours Scottish horticulturist James Justice (1698–1763). They are closely related to Pachystachys.

Description
They are evergreen, perennial plants and shrubs with leaves that are often strongly veined, but they are primarily cultivated for their showy, tubular flowers in shades of white, cream, yellow, orange, violet, or pink.  Excepting J. americana L., they are not hardy below , so must be grown under glass in frost-prone areas.

Species 

Selected species include:

J. brandegeeana (formerly Beloperone guttata, commonly called shrimp plant) is native to Mexico. It is hardy to −4 °C, but often recovers in the spring after freezing back in USDA Plant Zone 8a. J. carnea (formerly Jacobinia carnea, common names including Brazilian plume flower, flamingo flower, and jacobinia) is native to South America in southern Brazil, Paraguay, and northern Argentina. It is hardy to −2 °C but often recovers in the spring after freezing back in USDA Plant Zone 8a. J. procumbens is a procumbent herb with angular stems, swollen at the nodes, with small, ovate leaves; small, purple flowers in terminal spikes; inserted didynamous stamens; and shortly bilobed stigmata.

References

USDA Plants Profile: Justicia

External links 

 

 
Acanthaceae genera